Chamo is a town in central Nigeria.

Transport 

It is served by a somewhat distant station on the national railway system.

See also 

 Railway stations in Nigeria

References 

Towns in Nigeria